Philip Cunningham (born 7 December 1974 in Macclesfield, Cheshire) is an English guitarist who is a member of the bands Marion, New Order, Bad Lieutenant, ShadowParty and, more recently in 2020, Sea Fever.

Marion 
Cunningham is a member of the Britpop group Marion, which formed in Macclesfield in 1993. Along with singer Jaime Harding and fellow guitarist Tony Grantham, Cunningham has writing credits for all of the band's songs. After Marion's second album, The Program (recorded with Johnny Marr), frictions within the band began to take their toll; as a result, after heading to America for a fresh start, the band went their separate ways in 1999.

Cunningham joined Electronic as a touring guitarist, working again with Marr and Bernard Sumner from New Order as they promoted their third album Twisted Tenderness. Additionally, he played with LA band Run Run Run, Label and Tailgunner.

Cunningham and Harding resurrected Marion in 2006. Despite releasing an EP of new material and performing well-received live shows, they disbanded again in 2008 as a result of health issues within the band.

In 2011, Marion once again reconvened, with Grantham and bassist Julian Phillips joining Cunningham and Harding, and Jack Mitchell (formerly of Haven) on drums. Their comeback gig was recorded and released as the Alive in Manchester album in April 2012, and the release was accompanied by their first UK tour in over a decade. There are plans for further live shows and a third studio album.

New Order 
In 2001, Cunningham joined New Order, initially as a touring musician in place of Gillian Gilbert who had stepped back from live commitments to care for her children. At this time New Order were touring Get Ready, their first album in eight years, and were enjoying a renaissance, playing shows in Europe, Japan and the United States. Cunningham remained part of New Order for the 2005 album Waiting for the Sirens' Call, where he made his recording and co-writing debut with the band.

From 2007 to 2011 the band were on hiatus, but Cunningham was once again part of New Order's 2011 reunion concerts, this time with Gilbert also returning to the band. He continues to perform with the band to the present day. Cunningham returned with New Order in 2015 to co-write and record Music Complete, along with new bass player, Tom Chapman.

2014 saw the band announce that they would participate in the annual Tibet House Benefit Concert at Carnegie Hall in New York, alongside the likes of Iggy Pop, Patti Smith and Philip Glass.

2021 saw the band return to live action in September at the Piece Hall in Halifax, followed by a sold-out homecoming gig at Heaton Park in Manchester. In November, New Order performed at the MITS Award in London and also playing a headline show at the o2 Arena in London. 2022 saw the band perform on a long awaited U.S tour with electro-pop duo, Pet Shop Boys

Bad Lieutenant 
During a break in New Order activity, Cunningham joined Sumner and Jake Evans (who was part of Marion from 2006 to 2008) to form Bad Lieutenant, which also featured Jack Mitchell, Stephen Morris (New Order) on drums and Alex James (Blur) on bass. Cunningham split the writing duties with Sumner and Evans on the band's debut album, Never Cry Another Tear.

ShadowParty 
In 2014, Cunningham and fellow New Order member, Tom Chapman, formed ShadowParty alongside Josh Hager and Jeff Friedl of electronica legends, Devo. The band had originated after a meeting between Chapman and Hager in Boston, Massachusetts, and they immediately formed the nucleus of the band, with Cunningham and Friedl completing the line up. July 2018 saw the release of the bands eponymous debut album, released on the Mute label. They collaborated with the likes of Manchester singer, Denise Johnson, best known for her work with Scottish rockers, Primal Scream, Nick McCabe, best known for his time in The Verve and Black Submarine, Jack Mitchell and Iwan Gronow, best known for their work with Johnny Marr, American DJ, Whitney Fierce and English composer, Joe Duddell. The album release saw the band playing at festivals, such as Festival No. 6 in Portmeirion in Wales, North By Northwich, The Great Escape Festival in Brighton and the Dot To Dot Festival. They also made their debut headlining tour in the UK in September of the same year, and have recently completed a successful tour of Italy in January, 2019. The band enjoyed a successful tour supporting The Slow Readers Club in March this year too. The band also headlined Glasgow and supported A Certain Ratio in Manchester in May 2019.

Sea Fever (band) 
2020 saw Cunningham become one of the founding members of Sea Fever, a collaboration between Iwan Gronow, best known as the bass player for Haven and Johnny Marr, Beth Cassidy of Section 25, Cunningham's New Order bandmate, Tom Chapman and drummer, Elliot Barlow. The band debuted their single, 'Crossed Wires' (a song featuring New Order drummer, Stephen Morris) in October 2020 and the song has also been featured on the Chris Hawkins BBC 6 Music morning radio show. Their debut album, 'Folding Lines', was released on 22 October 2021, and the band played a successful album release show at the Night & Day Cafe in Manchester on the same day. Further singles, 'De Facto', 'Under Duress', 'Folding Lines' and 'Afterthought' were also released in 2021. Sea Fever also played many live dates, including Manchester and Hebden Bridge. They made their festival debut at Bluedot and then at Kendal Calling. They are due to play at the Shiiine On Weekender Festival in November, with coinciding gigs in Manchester, Cardiff and London.

Discography

with Marion
 This World and Body (1996)
 The Program (1998)
 Alive In Manchester (2012)

with New Order
 Waiting for the Sirens' Call (2005)
 Live at the London Troxy (2011)
 Live at Bestival 2012 (2013)
 Lost Sirens (2013)
 Music Complete (2015)
 Complete Music (2016)
 NOMC15 (2017)
 Σ(No,12k,Lg,17Mif) New Order + Liam Gillick: So it goes.. (Live at MIF) (2019)
 Be A Rebel (single) (2020)

with Bad Lieutenant
 Never Cry Another Tear (2009)

with ShadowParty
ShadowParty (2018)
After Party E.P (2018)
The Town Hall Sessions E.P (2019)

with Sea Fever
 Folding Lines (album) (2021)
 Crossed Wires (single) (2021)
 De Facto (single) (2021)
 Folding Lines (single) (2021)
 Under Duress (single) (2021)
 Afterthought (single) (2021)
 Beleaguered Land (single) (2022)

References 

 

1974 births
20th-century English musicians
21st-century English musicians
Britpop musicians
English rock guitarists
British synth-pop musicians
Ivor Novello Award winners
Living people
New Order (band) members
People from Macclesfield
British post-punk musicians